Megalomys curazensis is a species of rodent from the Late Pleistocene (400,000 to 130,000 years ago) of the island of Curaçao, off northwestern Venezuela. It is a member of the genus Megalomys, which also includes species from other islands of the Lesser Antilles. It is known from abundant but fragmentary material found throughout the island.

References

Bibliography 
 Buisonjé, P.H. de. 1974. Neogene and Quaternary geology of Aruba, Curaçao and Bonaire. Uitgaven "Natuurwetenschappelijke Studiekring voor Suriname en de Nederlandse Antillen" 74:1–291.
 Hooijer, D.A. 1959. Fossil rodents from Curaçao and Bonaire. Studies on the Fauna of Curaçao and other Caribbean Islands 35:1–27.
 

Megalomys
Pleistocene rodents
Pleistocene mammals of South America
Lujanian
Pleistocene Caribbean
Fossils of Curaçao
Fossil taxa described in 1959